Honnywill may refer to:
Dora Honnywill (1870-1959), British archer
Eleanor Honnywill (1919 or 1920 - 2003), British writer and Antarctic survey administrator
Honnywill Peak, mountain in Antarctica named for Eleanor

See also
Honeywell (disambiguation)
Honeywill